Raghogarh State, also known as Raghugarh and as Khichiwara, was a princely state of the Gwalior Residency, under the Central India Agency of the British Raj. 
It was a Thikana state of about 109 km2 with a population of 19,446 inhabitants in 1901. The Parbati River marked the western border of the state.
The capital was at Raghogarh in present-day Guna district of Madhya Pradesh.

History
Raghogarh State was established in 1673 by Lal Singh Khichi, a Rajput of the Chauhan Khichi clan, a branch of the clan to which Prithviraj Chauhan the founder of Delhi belonged. The state took its name from the fort of Raghogarh, founded in 1673 by Raja Lal Singh himself in 1677. Raghogarh state prospered for a century, but saw its fortune wane owing to Maratha attacks led by Mahadaji Shinde around 1780.

By 1818 there were disputes regarding succession in Raghogarh, which were settled through the intervention of the British authorities.

Rulers

The ruling family were members of the Khichi Chauhan Dynasty of Rajputs. The rulers used the title of Raja.

Hindupat Raja Lal Singhji (1673- 97 A.D.) He is the founder of the State of Raghogarh. Raja Lal Singh usually resided in Jharkon in Ahirwara in Pargana Balabhent where he happened to discover a saptdhat image of Ram (Raghoji) on the top of a hill. He established this image in the fort palace of Raghogarh which he has founded in V. 1734-1677 A.D. (Magh Sudi 5) on an elevation in the village of Kotda.
Gugor Fort - Chhabra Gugor. As Gugor was always in imminent danger of being invaded by the Hadas from Baran, the Khichi rulers had been on the lookout for a more suitable and central place to make it their third capital after they had ruled from Gugor for a period of 400 years. With the transfer of the capital to Raghogarh, Gugor was added to the Thikana of Chhabra which came to be called Chhabra Gugor, as it is known at present. Lal Singhji was a brave warrior and built mansions and temples, dug tanks and baoris (stepwells) and laid a garden. He gave land to temples. Lal Singhji was the son of Raja Garibdas. Amongst his three brothers, one got the thikana of Bhamawad: he is ancestor of the Rajas of Garha-Jamner; the second one got Maksudangarh State, a branch of Raghogarh; and Ajab Singh got Guna.
Raja Dhiraj Singh (1697-1726 A.D.) 2nd Raja of Raghogarh. He had great relations with Jai Singh Kachhawaha of Amber (Jaipur) and Maharana Sangram Singh II of the house of Sisodias. He built temples, tanks, baoris and repaired the fortress of Aron Jharkon and Chanchoda. He has constructed the greater portion of Raghogarh fort palace. He was a lover of learning and patronized music and painting. He got a copy of Prithviraj Raso transcribed as early as 1708 A.D. and a set of his own portraits in different aspects preserved in the archives of Raghogarh, besides paintings on subject of Rag-Ragini, Bara masa and frescoes of Ramayana and Mahabharata on the walls of Charbhujaji Temple in Dhirpur village. These rare specimens of the Raghogarh School of Malwa Paintings still await the attention of connoisseurs of art. Dhiraj Singhji was charitable and generous towards Bhats, Bairagis, and Brahmanas etc. He died in war. His memorial at Bajrangarh fortress is worshipped till today as that of a Sidh.
Bajrangarh Fortress (Jharkon)
Raja Gaj Singh (1726–29), 3rd Raja of Raghogarh - The eldest son of Dheeraj Singhji.
Raja Vikramaditya I ( 1730–44), 4th Raja of Raghogarh - he annexed Chhabra Gugor. His brave son Balbhadra Singh I put down the Rajput combination of Jagat Singh (Udaipur), Durjansal (Kota), Umaid Singh (Bundi) and Jagat Singh Rawat (Rajgarh) single-handedly. His mother Rani Anup kunwar Gaudji was equally brave and fought against the Nawab of Bhopal.
Raja Balbhadra Singh I (1744–70) - 5th Raja of Raghogarh - He openly stood to oppose Marathas. Married and had issue
 Raja Balwant Singh
Raja Budh Singh, he was granted a tract of land by his brother in 1776, which later became the state of Maksudangarh, married and had issue. He died in 1795.
Raja Balwant Singh (1770–97) - 6th Raja of Raghogarh married and had issue Raja Jai Singh.
Hindupat Raja Jai Singh (1797-1818) - 7th Raja of Raghogarh He was 17 years old at the time of his installation in 1797. The exploits of Jai Singh have inspired heroic poetry. He was a far more famous warrior than his father Balbhadra Singh.
Raja Ajit Singh - (1818–56) - 8th Raja of Raghogarh He patronized pundits and poets and very versed in music and poetry. He supported Nana Saheb Peshwa, Tatiya Toppe and Shahdat Khan of Indore.
Raja Jai Mandal Singh (1856-1900) - 9th Raja of Raghogarh Born 1821, succeeded 1856. He was quite hostile in the mutiny of 1857. On occasion of Dushehra 20 -22 goats were being sacrificed in Raghogarh, which was stopped by him. He had a versatile interest in Chemistry, Ayurveda, Astronomy, horse riding, spiritual pursuits, athletics and yoga. Married, Rajkumari Anand Kumari daughter of Raja Udai Singhji of Banera, and his wife, Rani Jhalji and had issue.
Raja Vikramjit Singh
Rajkumari (name unknown), married 1875, the Raja of Sheopur - Baroda
Raja Vikramjit Singh II (1900–02) - 10th Raja of Raghogarh
Raja Bahadur Singh (1902–45) - 11th Raja of Raghogarh, Born 8 March 1891, succeeded 14 December 1902; married, Baijilal Krishna Kumari [Rani Krishna Kumari], daughter of Raja Akshay Singh of Banera, and his third wife, Rani Shubhra Kumari. In 1911 invited to Delhi Darbar while he was a student in Daly College Indore.
Raja Balbhadra Singh II (1945–67) - 12th Raja of Raghogarh, Born 1916, married Rani Aparna Kumari, died 1986, daughter of Maharaja Bahadur Chandra Mouleshwar Prasad Singh of Gidhaur. His succession was recognized in late 1948. He has received his education at Daly College Indore and was a good sports man like his father as well as a keen scholar. He obtained his post diploma from Mayo College, Ajmer and received the Viceroy's Gold Medal for all round efficiency. He was elected in 1952 as the member of Madhya Bharat Legislative Assembly from Raghogarh constituency. He besides being charitable rendered great service to the cause of Khichi Dynasty by causing records to be collected from Malwa and Rajasthan. These records consist of inscriptions, copper plates grants, folk songs, sanads etc. So little or nothing could be done in this direction except the publication of two booklets - 'Hindupat Vijay' and 'Khichi Vanshawali'.
Raja Digvijaya Singh ( 1947 ) - present Raja Saheb of Raghogarh since 1967. (P.O. Raghogarh, Distt. Gunna - 473226, Madhya Pradesh) born 28 February 1947 in Indore, Madhya Pradesh. He did his schooling from Daly College and did his Bachelor of Engineering (Mechanical) from S.G.S.I.T.S., Indore. At school he was an outstanding sportsman in cricket, hockey and football; he also was the Central India squash champion. He was President of Raghogarh Municipal Corporation in 1969. He entered politics in 1971 and was elected Member of State Legislative Assembly (M.P.) in 1977. President of M.P. Congress Committee 1984. Minister of State and later a Cabinet Minister under the M.P. Government in 1980 - 84. Elected as a Member of Parliament in 1984 and 1991. General Secretary of All India Congress Committee of Assam, Uttar Pradesh, Bihar, Orissa and Andhra Pradesh. Chief Minister of Madhya Pradesh 1993 - 2003 (two terms). Married 11 December 1969, Rani Asha Kumari who died on 27 February 2013 in New Delhi, after a prolonged illness, daughter of Dr.Jagdev Singh of Ambatah in Himachal Pradeh, and his wife, a daughter of Raja Chattar Singh, Raja of Basantpur, and has four daughters and one son:
 Mrinalini Kumari, born 28 May 1971, married 24 April 1992 Shri Ratnakar Singh of Ramnagar-Dhameri, educated at Mayo College, Ajmer
Mandakini Kumari, born 13 February 1973, married 9 December 1993, Shri Paranjayaditya Krishnakumarsinhji, Maharana of Sant State.
Mradima Kumari born 29 April 1976, married 16 March 1996 Shri Ranjitsinhji of Muli.
Karnieka Kumari, born 27 April 1979, married 23 November 2005, Shri Siddharthsinhji Chaitanyadevsinhji Jhala of Wadhwan State.
Jaivardhan Singh born on 9 July 1986, married Srijamya Singh

See also
Madhya Pradesh
Political integration of India

References

External links

Raghogarh - Indian Rajputs

Princely states of India
Guna district
Rajputs